Lee Yong-Bal  (born 15 March 1973) is a South Korean retired footballer who played as a goalkeeper.

External links 

1973 births
Living people
Association football goalkeepers
South Korean footballers
Jeju United FC players
Jeonbuk Hyundai Motors players
Gyeongnam FC players